The Electoral district of Dunolly was an electoral district of the Victorian Legislative Assembly.  It was created by the Electoral Act Amendment Act 1888, taking effect at the 1889 elections. 
It was abolished by the Victorian Electoral Districts Boundaries Act 1903 
(taking effect at the 1904 elections) when several new districts were created.

Members of Dunolly

See also
 Parliaments of the Australian states and territories
 List of members of the Victorian Legislative Assembly

References

Former electoral districts of Victoria (Australia)
1889 establishments in Australia
1904 disestablishments in Australia